Aleksey Pavlovich Chapygin (- 21 October 1937) was a Russian writer, and one of the founders of the Soviet historical novel.

Biography
Chapygin was born in Kargopolsky Uyezd, Olonets Governorate. His northern peasant origins are reflected in his works. His first book of stories, Those Who Keep Aloof, and his novel The White Hermitage, describing northern life, were published before the Russian Revolution of 1917.  He is best known for his two novels about peasant uprisings in the 17th century, Itinerant Folk (1934–37) and Stepan Razin (1926–27). Stepan Razin is considered a classic of Soviet literature.

Chapygin drew upon Russian folklore for both the style of Stepan Razin and the positive and romanticized portrait of Razin himself. The Soviets excused this modernization of history as a justifiable polemic against the negative portrayal of Razin in 19th-century Russian literature. Stepan Razin was published in the magazine Red Virgin Soil.

English translations

Stepan Razin, Hutchinson International Authors, Ltd., London, 1946.

External links
 Biography 
 Aleksey Chapygin Razin Stepan

References

1870 births
1937 deaths
People from Plesetsky District
People from Kargopolsky Uyezd
Soviet novelists
Soviet male writers
20th-century Russian male writers
Russian historical novelists
Russian male short story writers
Soviet short story writers
20th-century Russian short story writers